Francisca Guzmán (born 21 June 1981) is a retired Chilean athlete who specialised in the 100 metres hurdles.

Her personal bests of 13.30 seconds in the 100 metres hurdles (2003) and 8.54 seconds in the 60 metres hurdles (2009) are both standing national records.

Competition record

References

1981 births
Living people
Chilean female hurdlers
Athletes (track and field) at the 2003 Pan American Games
Olympic athletes of Chile
Competitors at the 2003 Summer Universiade
Pan American Games competitors for Chile
20th-century Chilean women
21st-century Chilean women